Nakasongola Military Hospital is a military hospital in Uganda. It is the only accredited hospital in Nakasongola District.

Location

Overview
The hospital serves as the primary healthcare facility for the various units of the UPDF occupying the  military complex in the district, including:

 Uganda Air Force Academy
 Nakasongola Air Forces Base
 Nakasongola Airport
 Uganda Special Forces Group
 Luweero Industries Limited
 Uganda Air Defense Division
 Uganda Marine Unit

Nakasongola Hospital is working in collaboration with the University of Connecticut, with funding from PEPFAR, to develop an anti-retroviral adherence intervention program.

See also
List of hospitals in Uganda
Uganda People's Defence Force

References

Hospitals in Uganda
Uganda People's Defence Force
Nakasongola District
Central Region, Uganda